These are the UK Official Indie Chart number-one hits of the 1980s, as compiled by MRIB.

1980

1981

1982

1983

1984

1985

1986

1987

1988

1989

See also
List of UK Independent Albums Chart number ones of the 1980s
1980s in music
List of UK Singles Chart number ones of the 1980s

References

United Kingdom Indie
UK Indie Chart number-one singles
Indie 1980s